Fried durian is a form of preparation for durian. Today, fried durian consumption is widespread in Thailand. It is available everywhere, especially in souvenir shops nationwide. There are also many products from fried durian such as crackers with fried durian. For foreigners, fried durian always makes them feel amazing from its taste that is totally different from real durian. This makes fried durian one of the most popular souvenirs that foreigners who come to Thailand have to buy.4

History 
In 1988, agriculturists in Rayong province lost their incomes from durian overflow. Moreover, the increase of worms that pierced durian seeds made durians have a bitter taste and could not be sold as ripe durian. Agricultural authority and local people tried to solve this problem by creating new ways to eat unripe durian. They tested many recipes to make it better and edible for everyone. Finally, they invented fried durian that could retain its sweet taste, nutritional value, with a long shelf life and deodorization. Fried durian started to hit the shelf in 1989 and rapidly gained popularity.

References

Thai desserts and snacks